"I'll See You in My Dreams" is a power ballad by the American rock band Giant from their debut studio album Last of the Runaways, released in 1989. It was written by Alan Pasqua and Mark Spiro and sung by Dann Huff.

The song entered the Billboard Hot 100, peaking at #20. It is their only Top 40 hit on that chart, making them a one-hit wonder.

The American glam metal band BulletBoys covered the song on their 2011 album Rocked and Ripped, which is a collection of cover songs.

Personnel
Dann Huff – vocals, guitars
Alan Pasqua – keyboards, backing vocals
Mike Brignardello – bass guitar, backing vocals
David Huff – drums, backing vocals

References

External links
Giant's "I'll See You In My Dreams" on Last.fm

1989 songs
1990 singles
Giant (band) songs
A&M Records singles
Songs written by Mark Spiro
Glam metal ballads